Bally Haly Golf & Curling Club, is a semi-private curling club and golf course located in St. John's, Newfoundland and Labrador, Canada. It is the oldest golf club in Atlantic Canada, having been founded in 1896. In that year, a group of ten prominent Newfoundland gentlemen formed the Newfoundland Golf Club.

History
The first golf course was a 9-hole layout on Buckmasters field. This original 9-hole course, however, had limited area for expansion and in 1908, with the growing popularity of the game, club President, the Hon. John Browning, negotiated with the trustees of the estate of Lieutenant Colonel William Haly for the former British Garrison land adjacent to the Virginia River in east St. John's. Upon acquiring a plot of land of approximately two hundred acres in size, the club was renamed the Bally Haly Golf Club and an 18-hole course was constructed.

In 2017, after winning the 2017 Tim Hortons Brier on home ice at Mile One Centre, Team Gushue, who curls out of both the St. John's Curling Club and Bally Haly, were honoured by the Bally Haly Golf & Curling Club by naming their four sheets of ice after Lead Geoff Walker, Second Brett Gallant, Third Mark Nichols and Skip Brad Gushue.

See also
List of golf courses in Newfoundland and Labrador

External links
Official website

Golf clubs and courses in Newfoundland and Labrador
1896 establishments in Canada
Curling clubs in Canada
Sports venues in St. John's, Newfoundland and Labrador
1896 establishments in Newfoundland

Curling in Newfoundland and Labrador